Mimosestes is a genus of pea and bean weevils in the beetle family Chrysomelidae. There are about 13 described species in Mimosestes.

Species
These 13 species belong to the genus Mimosestes:

 Mimosestes acaciestes Kingsolver & Johnson, 1978
 Mimosestes amicus (Horn, 1873)
 Mimosestes anomalus Johnson
 Mimosestes chrysocosmus Kingsolver, 1985
 Mimosestes enterolobii Johnson
 Mimosestes insularis Kingsolver & Johnson, 1978
 Mimosestes janzeni Johnson
 Mimosestes mimosae (Fabricius, 1781)
 Mimosestes mimose (Fabricius, 1781)
 Mimosestes nubigens (Motschulsky, 1874)
 Mimosestes playazul Johnson
 Mimosestes protractus (Horn, 1873)
 Mimosestes ulkei (Horn, 1873) (retama weevil)

References

Further reading

 
 
 

Bruchinae
Articles created by Qbugbot
Chrysomelidae genera